"Adenoa"  of C.S. Rafinesque-Schmaltz is a nomen nudum for Galleria, the genus of the greater wax moth.

Adeona is a genus of bryozoans in the family Adeonidae. A typical example is the Australian species Adeona cellulosa that forms large colonies with bifoliate sheets containing numerous holes (fenestrae).

Selected species
 Adeona albida
 Adeona appendiculata
 Adeona arborescens
 Adeona articulata
 Adeona bipartita
 Adeona cellulosa
 Adeona costata
 Adeona didymopora
 Adeona foliifera
 Adeona grisea
 Adeona intermedia
 Adeona macrothyris
 Adeona nipponica
 Adeona wilsoni

References 

Cheilostomatida
Bryozoan genera